Louis Victoire Lux de Montmorin-Saint-Hérem (1762–1792) was a French military man who was impaled to death during the September Massacres of the French Revolution.

1762 births
1792 deaths
French counter-revolutionaries
French military personnel
People from Fontainebleau
People killed in the French Revolution
People murdered in France